Tkoutt (in the Berber language: Tkukt or Kukt or ⵝⴾⵓⴾⵝ) is a town in north-eastern Algeria.

Communes of Batna Province